St. Angela's College, Sligo is a college of the Atlantic Technological University located beside Lough Gill, County Sligo.

History

St. Angela’s College was founded by the Ursuline Order in 1952 and was a recognised college of the National University of Ireland from 1978-2006. In 2006 the college became a recognised constituent college of the National University of Ireland Galway. It became a college of the Atlantic Technological University in 2022.

Academics
The college initially offered a three-year teaching diploma in Home Economics. This three year course continued until 1978 when a four year university degree course was introduced, with the first students graduating in 1981 with NUI degrees. In 1997, the Food Technology Centre was established, with nursing degree programmes commencing in 2002. 

In 2007, St Catherine’s College of Education for Home Economics closed and St Angela's became the sole provider of home economics education in Ireland.

Administration
In 1952, the college was founded with Mother Malachy, a nun, in charge of the institution. In 1958 Mother Brid, also a nun, took over as a principal. Brid served the college until 1983 where Sister Marianne O'Connor was appointed as president, replacing the principal role. In 2001, O'Connor stepped down as President and Michael Hanley served as president until his death in 2004, Dr. Anne Taheny was then appointed president of St Angela's College. In 2019, Tahney retired as president after a 15 year tenure, with Amanda Mc Cloat holding the position of acting President until a successor was appointed. In 2021, Dr Edel McSharry, former head of the school of nursing, took over the role of acting President to be replaced by Dr. Amanda McCloat in 2022.

References

Buildings and structures of the University of Galway
Educational institutions established in 1978
Education in County Sligo
Education schools in Ireland
Catholic universities and colleges in the Republic of Ireland
Universities and colleges in the Republic of Ireland